The molecular formula C20H26N4O5S may refer to:

 Niperotidine
 Diabenor, N-(2-{4-[(Cikloheksilkarbamoil)sulfamoil]fenil}etil)-5-metil-1,2-oksazol-3-karboksamid

Molecular formulas